The Central District of Andimeshk County is a district (bakhsh) in Andimeshk County, Khuzestan Province, Iran. At the 2006 census, its population was 134,916, in 29,321 families.  The District has three cities: Andimeshk, Cham Golak & Shahrak-e Babak. The District has one rural district (dehestan): Howmeh Rural District.

References 

Andimeshk County
Districts of Khuzestan Province